Luis Ignacio Aseff (born 22 September 1983) was an Argentine footballer currently playing for Pérez Zeledón.

References
 

1983 births
Living people
Argentine footballers
Argentine expatriate footballers
Aldosivi footballers
Unión San Felipe footballers
Rangers de Talca footballers
Unión de Santa Fe footballers
Santiago Morning footballers
Naval de Talcahuano footballers
People from San Nicolás de los Arroyos
Sportspeople from Buenos Aires Province
Expatriate footballers in Chile
Association football goalkeepers